The 2015 China Victory Day parade was a military parade held along Chang'an Avenue, Beijing, on 3 September 2015 to celebrate the 70th anniversary of Victory over Japan Day of World War II. The commemoration was the first high-profile military parade held to celebrate an occasion other than the National Day of the People's Republic of China. 12,000 troops of the People's Liberation Army participated in the parade, in addition to over 1,000 troops from 17 different countries, and about 850,000 "Citizen Guards" were mobilised to guard the city. Chinese Communist Party leader Xi Jinping inspected the troops, Premier Li Keqiang was the master of ceremonies and General Song Puxuan was the chief commander of the parade.

Background 

The 70th Anniversary of V-day parade marked the first time that China held a military parade other than the National Day, and the first to celebrate the end of World War II. Since the founding of the People's Republic in 1949, China held parades primarily on 1 October, the country's national day. The most prominent renditions of the parade were held in 1959, 1984, 1999, and 2009, presided over respectively by then leaders Mao Zedong, Deng Xiaoping, Jiang Zemin, and Hu Jintao. The 70th anniversary parade was also the first major parade since Xi Jinping took power as the General Secretary of the Chinese Communist Party (China's paramount leader) in 2012. The prevailing theme was to be "peace and victory". Xi Jinping had attended the 2015 Moscow Victory Day Parade in May as the guest-of-honour of Russian president Vladimir Putin, and Putin returned the favour at this parade.

Preparations and restrictions 
National leadership placed considerable importance on being able to put the best foot forward and do away with distractions. Bloomberg reported that the central government once again intervened in the stock market to ensure stability ahead of the anniversary; there were traffic curfews and closures of public facilities including seven parks and some hospitals. Line 1, Beijing Subway, which passes underneath Chang'an Avenue, was shut down; 256 bus-lines in Beijing were placed under tight transport restrictions from 2–4 September. On the day of the parade, hospitals restricted most of their activities beyond emergencies, the stock markets were closed. Areas in the city centre were placed under martial law, and 850,000 "citizen guards" were deployed to ensure security within the city. The city authorities sent in trained macaques and falcons to make sure the skies over central Beijing were free of birds that would put the flypast at risk. The trained macaque monkeys climbed trees and dismantled birds nests in advance of the parade. Hot air balloons and hang gliders were equally barred from the city; those residing along Chang'an Avenue were forbidden from opening their windows during the lock-down period. Domestic satellite televisions were restricted from playing entertainment programs between 1–5 September. China Central Television ceased the broadcasting of all entertainment programming, only playing films and TV series about the Second World War. Xi Jinping decreed the creation of two new public holidays targeted at Japan, the first being 3 September – Victory over Japan Day, officially named The 70th anniversary of Chinese People's Anti-Japanese War and the World Anti-Fascist War Victory Commemoration Day. The second one was declared for 13 December, marking the Japanese takeover of Nanjing, China's then capital under the Nationalists and the Nanking massacre that followed, which resulted in many Chinese deaths by Japanese military personnel garrisoned in the city. The CY Leung administration in Hong Kong argued for a holiday to facilitate participation in commemorative events, thus it tabled the "Special Holiday (3 September 2015) Ordinance" – designating the day as a one-off holiday – for debate in the Legislative Council of Hong Kong (LegCo) in July. The act passed despite strong resistance and more than 90 amendments from one legislator.

To reduce air pollution and ensure blue skies for the parade, half of Beijing's cars were barred from the streets and nearly 10,000 industrial firms in Beijing and in areas near and far – Hebei, Tianjin, Shanxi, Inner Mongolia, Shandong and Henan – suspended or cut production starting on 20 August to cut down on emissions. The factory shut-downs and road closures gave rise to rare instance of clean air, where PM2.5 measurements were below 50, and the lack of traffic jams, and these were welcomed by residents of the capital. Observers noted that the umbrella, which became iconic in Hong Kong during the protests in 2014, were nowhere to be seen despite the blazing heat although commonly used as a shield against the sun in China.

Leaders in attendance

Chinese leaders
Xi Jinping, who holds the posts for the General Secretary of the Chinese Communist Party, President of the People's Republic of China, and Chairman of the Central Military Commission, was the central figure of the day's events.  Premier Li Keqiang was the master of ceremonies for the parade, breaking convention from its two previous renditions of the parade, which were both hosted by the Communist Party Secretary of Beijing (Jia Qinglin in 1999 and Liu Qi in 2009). General Song Puxuan, Commander of the Northern Theater Command, greeted Xi in front of Tiananmen at the start of the parade during the inspection segment, declaring the readiness of the troops for the marchpast.

Atop Tiananmen, Xi Jinping wore a Mao suit, as was customary for leaders inspecting troops at military parades; his wife Peng Liyuan wore a red dress. The remaining political figures wore business suits. Xi delivered the keynote address at the parade with an unexpected announcement of a plan to cut 300,000 personnel from the Chinese military. The other members of the CCP Politburo Standing Committee, Zhang Dejiang, Yu Zhengsheng, Liu Yunshan, Wang Qishan, and Zhang Gaoli, watched the parade on top of Tiananmen Gate.

Former paramount leaders Jiang Zemin and Hu Jintao; former Premiers Li Peng, Zhu Rongji and Wen Jiabao; and other former senior leaders Li Ruihuan, Wu Bangguo, Jia Qinglin, Li Lanqing, Song Ping, Zeng Qinghong, Wu Guanzheng, Li Changchun, Luo Gan, and He Guoqiang, also attended the parade at Tiananmen. This meant that all former members of the Standing Committee who were in good standing with the party and alive at the time of the parade attended the event; they sat in strict protocol sequence to the right of the members of the incumbent Politburo Standing Committee.

Hong Kong Special Administration Region chief executive Leung Chun-ying also led a 300-person group at the parade, and Macau Chief Executive Fernando Chui also attended.

List of dignitaries in attendance

The following countries sent their former leaders to the parade :
  Former Chancellor Gerhard Schröder of Germany.
  Former Prime Minister Tony Blair of the United Kingdom.
  Former Prime Minister Tomiichi Murayama of Japan.
  Former President Joseph Estrada of the Philippines. Estrada attended the parade, not as a representative of his country but as part of his duties as Mayor of Manila. Estrada cited the fact that Manila and Beijing were sister cities as his reason for attending the event.
  Former Captain Regent Gianfranco Terenzi of San Marino.
  Former Deputy Prime Minister Wong Kan Seng of Singapore
  Former Vice President and Premier Lien Chan of the Republic of China (Taiwan)
  Former President José Ramos-Horta of East Timor

Leaders of the following international organizations were in attendance:
  Director-General Irina Bokova of the UNESCO
  Secretary-General Ban Ki-moon of the United Nations.
  President Peter Maurer of the International Committee of the Red Cross

In addition, many embassies around Beijing also sent their defense attaches and military generals to attend the parade.

Criticisms 
Taiwan's Mainland Affairs Council, President Ma Ying-jeou and his Kuomintang objected to the event and what they see as the CCP usurping credit for leading the Chinese defence against Japan during World War II. However, former Chairman of the Kuomintang Lien Chan also attended the parade, ostensibly in his personal capacity, sparking controversy at home. Whilst Tsai Ing-wen, leader of the Taiwanese opposition, criticised Lian for failing to represent the views of the majority of Taiwanese, observers noted that Lien had considerable business interests on the mainland he sought to protect, likewise the Kuomintang also had interests on the mainland. Hong Kong commentator Frank Ching added that Lien Chan's presence at the ceremony undermined the KMT, as China appeared to erase the role of the Nationalists in defending China.

Other pundits said that the main object of the parade was to rewrite history and elevate the CCP's position in ending the war.

Kyodo News Agency cited a US department of State spokesman that United States objected the President of Sudan Bashir to attend the parade in the news conference held on 31 August 2015. He stated that China should consider about the international society's worry as a UN security council member with inviting or assisting someone who is wanted under the document of warrant signed by ICC.

Parade groups 
Some 12,000 troops marched along Chang'an Avenue up to Tiananmen for inspection by Chinese leader Xi Jinping and the two living former leaders Jiang Zemin and Hu Jintao. There were 10 squads: 9 from the People's Liberation Army and 1 from the People's Armed Police). Each squad had 350 soldiers excluding the color guards, and were led by two major generals or lieutenant generals in active service. In total, 56 generals participated in the event. The military vehicle contingent were led by two Air Force lieutenant generals, a vice admiral and a lieutenant general of the People's Liberation Army Rocket Force: Tian Zhong, deputy commander of the PLA Navy, Chen Dong, deputy commander of the PLA Air Force, Wu Guohua, deputy commander of the PLA Rocket Force. Zheng Qunliang another deputy commander of the Air Force, commanded the squadron of jet fighters in the air. This was the first time in PRC's history that military parade contingents were led by officers ranked as high as lieutenant general.

Veterans 
Surviving soldiers from the Second World War joined the parade for the first time. They had fought under various commands, including the New Fourth Army, the National Revolutionary Army, and the Eighth Route Army, with most over 90 years old then. Some of the passed soldiers' widows marched in place of their husbands. Besides Chinese soldiers, some surviving airmen of United States Air Force who had fought alongside Chinese forces also joined the veterans column. The veterans rode in open-top buses at the start of the parade and were escorted by the People's Armed Police Motorcycle Escort Squadron.

Marchpast columns

Military bands in attendance
A 1,000 piece band was present to provide musical accompaniment to the parade. The bands were organized as follows:

Massed Joint-PLA Military Band under the direction of the Director of Music of the PLA Band, Zhang Haifing
Central Military Band of the People's Liberation Army of China
State Trumpeters
People's Liberation Army Navy Band
People's Liberation Army Air Force Female Band
People's Armed Police Band
Women's Military Band of the PLA National Defense University
4th Military Band of the PLA
14th Group Army Band
PLA Combined Chorus
Central Military Commission Political Work Department Song and Dance Troupe
Male singers who are students at Chinese military academies

Color party 
The color guard consisted of 207 men and women from the PLA Honor Guard Battalion, who escorted the national military colours. This marked the first occasion of female service personnel forming part of the honor guard during a national parade. Their first public presentation occurred during the state visit of the President of Turkmenistan to Beijing in May 2015, using the Type 56 ceremonial rifle.

Representative companies from CCP units of the Second Sino-Japanese War 
The CCP's hero squads consisted of detachments that traced their lineage to units that participated in the war against Japan, which included the "Five Heroes of Langya Mountain" (狼牙山五壮士), "Battle of Pingxingguan Hero Squad", and the "Hundred Regiments Offensive Hero Squad". Representative detachments from each Chinese military region participated in the parade, led by soldiers carrying standards used by the predecessor units.

These represented the following CCP formations during the war against Japan:

 Eighth Route Army
 New Fourth Army
 Northeast Anti-Japanese United Army
 Southern China guerrilla organizations under CCP control

People's Armed Police 
A detachment of the People's Armed Police also participated in the parade, the unit having previously been part of the PLA. The unit's lineage, through the 114th Division of the 38th Army, can also be traced to regiments that fought during the war.

Foreign contingents 

Groups from 17 countries were sent to take part in the military parade. Marching in alphabetical order these were:

Mobile column 

Type 99A Main Battle Tank
A group of the latest model of China's Type 99 main battle tank. The A marks the last iteration of the Type 99 as the tank is near finalization.

Amphibious squad
On parade where the infantry fighting vehicle (ZBD-05A) and fire support variants (ZTD-05) of the People's Liberation Army Marine Corps ZBD2000 vehicle, with an ability to plane when waterborne these are the fastest amphibious armoured fighting vehicles in the world.

Mechanised infantry combat vehicle squad
The ZBD-04A infantry fighting vehicle, a troop carrying counterpart to the Type 99 MBT was paraded.

Air-mobile infantry fighting vehicle squad
The ZBD-03 IFV is a light airmobile infantry fighting vehicle (IFV) and the most mobile IFV of China's People's Liberation Army, was displayed for the first time in the parade. Anti-tank missile and Light Assault Vehicles variants. came afterward.

Anti-tank guided missile squad
Self-propelled Red Arrow 10 anti-tank guided missile vehicles with anti-helicopter-warfare, fire and forget and man-in-the-loop capabilities were also paraded.

Self-propelled artillery squad
A group of PLZ-05A (1×155MM Howitzer) and PGZ-07 (2×35×228MM Oerlikon KDA guns) self-propelled guns, often nicknamed the "God of War" considering that they are the biggest guns in the Chinese military.

Wheeled amphibious fire support vehicle
Wheeled fast light patrol/attack vehicle
Wheeled anti-terrorism attack vehicle

Self-propelled anti-aircraft gun squad

The missile squad
DF-21D, the world's first Anti-Ship Ballistic Missile, was on display in the parade. They came immediately after the DF-15 and DF-16 missiles.

The DF-41, reportedly China's newest ICBM, was not shown in the parade.

Flyby

Fighter jet squad
The squad included 1 KJ-2000 and 8 J-10. They were first displayed in 2009 China's National Day Parade.

China's newest early warning plane, the KJ-500, was displayed for the first time in this parade.

The H-6K was debuted as well.

5×Shenyang J-15, a carrier-based fighter jet, was also debuted in this parade.

China's most advanced fighter jet, the J-20, was not shown in the parade.

Helicopter Squad
8×WZ-10 (7) and 12×WZ-19 (0) helicopters formed the number "70" in the sky at 10:20 to mark the 70 years since the Victory over the Japanese.

After the parade
The Parade began at 10:09 and ended at 11:40. After the parade, Xi Jinping held a reception of the visiting international dignitaries.

China's Ministry of National Defence spokesman Yang Yujun said that the cuts to the size of the military would include personnel not trained for battle.

According to his opinion, China will modify the 'command system' by simplifying its management structure. China's one-star general Xu Guangyu also said that the China's People's Armed Police will be reformed appropriately.

For historical reasons, China's military structure emphasizes the army and land forces.

References

External links 

Farce to fuss over China's military parade
Eight Highlights in China's V-Day Military Parade 
2015 China's Victory Day Parade from CCTV

Second Sino-Japanese War
Events in Beijing
Military parades in China
Aftermath of World War II
2015 in China
Military history of the People's Republic of China
2015 in military history
China–Japan relations
2010s in Beijing
September 2015 events in China